Stites is a city in Idaho County, Idaho, United States. In the lower canyon of the South Fork of the Clearwater River, it is about four miles (6 km) upstream and south of Kooskia on State Highway 13. The population was 221 at the 2010 census, down from 226 in 2000.

History
Stites was named for Jacob Stites of New Jersey, who homesteaded the land in 1897 which became the city. He sold two years later and exercised his option to name it. Stites became the eastern terminus Northern Pacific branch line up the Clearwater in 1900, later the Camas Prairie Railroad's first subdivision line. It climbed the main river eastward from Lewiston to Kooskia and then turned south to ascend the lower South Fork. The abandoned spur was removed in the 1980s, and the city incorporated in early 1905.

Geography
Stites is located at  (46.090, -115.976).

Demographics

2010 census
As of the census of 2010, there were 221 people, 103 households, and 57 families residing in the city. The racial makeup of the city was 95.0% White, 1.4% African American, 1.8% Native American, and 1.8% from two or more races. Hispanic or Latino of any race were 3.2% of the population.

There were 103 households, of which 22.3% had children under the age of 18 living with them, 44.7% were married couples living together, 7.8% had a female householder with no husband present, 2.9% had a male householder with no wife present, and 44.7% were non-families. 34.0% of all households were made up of individuals, and 16.5% had someone living alone who was 65 years of age or older. The average household size was 2.15 and the average family size was 2.79.

The median age in the city was 47.1 years. 20.4% of residents were under the age of 18; 8.5% were between the ages of 18 and 24; 19.5% were from 25 to 44; 32.5% were from 45 to 64; and 19% were 65 years of age or older. The gender makeup of the city was 48.0% male and 52.0% female.

2000 census
As of the census of 2000, there were 226 people, 101 households, and 58 families residing in the city. The racial makeup of the city was 95.58% White, 2.21% Native American, 0.44% Asian, and 1.77% from two or more races. Hispanic or Latino of any race were 1.33% of the population.

There were 101 households, out of which 24.8% had children under the age of 18 living with them, 44.6% were married couples living together, 9.9% had a female householder with no husband present, and 41.6% were non-families. 34.7% of all households were made up of individuals, and 18.8% had someone living alone who was 65 years of age or older.  The average household size was 2.24 and the average family size was 2.88.

In the city, the population was spread out, with 22.1% under the age of 18, 11.9% from 18 to 24, 21.2% from 25 to 44, 27.4% from 45 to 64, and 17.3% who were 65 years of age or older.  The median age was 42 years. For every 100 females, there were 98.2 males.  For every 100 females age 18 and over, there were 100.0 males.

The median income for a household in the city was $22,386, and the median income for a family was $30,000. Males had a median income of $35,625 versus $13,750 for females. The per capita income for the city was $10,933.  About 16.2% of families and 17.8% of the population were below the poverty line, including 9.6% of those under the age of eighteen and 23.7% of those 65 or over.

References

Cities in Idaho County, Idaho
Cities in Idaho